Harti is a sub-clan of the Somali Darod clan. 

Harti may also refer to;

Abgaal, themselves, a sub-clan of the Somali Hawiye clan have a sub-clan named Harti
Harti (Gadag district), a town in the Gadag district, Karnataka, India
Härti, a quarter in district 6, Winterthur in the canton of Zurich, Switzerland
Harti Weirather, an Austrian former alpine skier
Stade El Harti, a multi-use stadium in Marrakech, Morocco
Rhagada harti, a species of gastropod in the family Camaenidae
Cambarus harti, a species of crayfish in the family Cambaridae
Macrochilo orciferalis, a moth of the family Noctuidae, sometimes known as Macrochilo harti
Antheraea pernyi, a moth in the family Saturniidae, sometimes known as Antheraea hartii